Nikolaos Katravas was a Greek swimmer. He competed at the 1896 Summer Olympics in Athens. Katravas competed in the 1,200 metres freestyle event.  His time and place in the competition are unknown, though he did not finish in the top three.

References

External links

  

Year of birth missing
Year of death missing
Swimmers at the 1896 Summer Olympics
19th-century sportsmen
Olympic swimmers of Greece
Place of birth missing
Place of death missing
People from Cephalonia
Sportspeople from the Ionian Islands (region)